Allomethus brimleyi is a species of fly in the family Pipunculidae. It was described by Hardy in 1943.

It is endemic to North Carolina.

Distribution
United States.

References

Pipunculidae
Endemic fauna of North Carolina
Insects described in 1943
Diptera of North America
Taxa named by D. Elmo Hardy